Sem "Semtex" Braan (born October 6, 1979) is a Dutch Muay Thai super middleweight kickboxer fighting out of Amsterdam, Netherlands for Mejiro Gym.  He is the 2008 It's Showtime Reality Show winner currently competing in the It's Showtime 77MAX division.

Biography and career

Sem Braan made his debut with the It's Showtime organization in 2005 losing a super fight via decision to Ondřej Hutník.  He was invited to take part in the inaugural It's Showtime Trophy (75 kg/165.35 lbs weight class) in a preliminary tournament for the final to be held the following year.  He made the final in Tilburg only to lose to Emil Zoraj.  Braan was given a second chance to qualify at the It's Showtime event in Prague at the end of the year, again reaching the final only to lose again – this time to  Ondřej Hutník, the man who had beaten him on his debut earlier that year.

The following year Braan made his K-1 debut at the K-1 MAX Canarias 2006, dropping down in weight to take part in an eight-man tournament (70 kg/154 lbs weight class).  Never known for his ability for finishing opponents, Braan nevertheless blitzed through all opposition on the night, stopping all three opponents on his way to the title.  He added to his title collection in the spring of 2007, winning the W.A.K.O. European title in Porto against a Portuguese opponent he had defeated a couple of months previously.

Braan was invited to the second It's Showtime Trophy final in 2008, despite having lost in a qualifying tournament the previous year.  He made the semi finals of the tournament, beating Jiri Zak before losing to eventual winner Dmitry Shakuta by decision.  Later that year he won the It's Showtime Reality Show by beating Cosmo Alexandre in the final held at the K-1 World Grand Prix 2008 in Amsterdam and earned himself a shot against the It's Showtime Trophy champion Dmitry Shakuta for the inaugural It's Showtime 77MAX world title later that year.  In the title fight in Alkmaar Braan lost on points despite a late rally in the last two rounds, in which both fighters received eight counts.  Braan would get another shot at the title, several years later, again facing Shakuta for the belt.  The defending champion once more came out on top in the encounter, winning his third match in the trilogy between the pair via a comfortable point's decision.  In 2011 Sem won his first world title - winning the W.A.K.O. Pro world belt in Milan, Italy by defeating Mohamed Belkacem by unanimous decision after five rounds in a match where both fighters received 8 counts - Sem in the fourth and Belkacem in the fifth.

In a battle between two of the world's top 10 light heavyweights, Braan lost to Constantin Țuțu via decision at the KOK World Grand Prix 2012 in Chisnau, Moldova on September 29, 2012. He lost to Rickard Nordstrand via second-round KO at Fight Night 08 in Stockholm, Sweden on August 17, 2013.

Braan won, by defeating Errol Koning at Fight Fans 6" in Amsterdam, Holland on October 5, 2013. On February 8, 2014, Braan won by beating Marino Schouten for the second time at Fight Fans 8 in Amsterdam.

On December 1, 2014 Sem Braan opened his own gym, Mejiro Gym Wormer. By starting this Mejiro Gym division Braan shares his knowledge and experience with other fighters and shows kickboxing is for everyone both recreational and competition level.

Titles
2019 WFCA -79 kg World title
2017 K1 Andy Hug Memorial 2017 Tournament Runner Up
2016 WFL -76 kg Tournament Champion
2011 W.A.K.O. Pro K-1 Rules world champion -85 kg
2008 It's Showtime Reality Show winner -75 kg
2007 W.A.K.O. Pro K-1 Rules European champion -80 kg
2006 K-1 MAX Canarias champion -70 kg
2005 It's Showtime 75MAX Trophy Prague Pool B runner up -75 kg
2005 It's Showtime 75MAX Trophy Tilburg Pool B runner up -75 kg

 Kickboxing record 

|-  style="background:#fbb;"
| 2017-07-10 || Loss ||align=left| Dylan Colin || K1 Andy Hug Memorial 2017, Final  || Zug, Switzerland || Decision (Unanimous)  || 3 || 3:00
|-
! style=background:white colspan=9 |
|-
|-  style="background:#cfc;"
| 2017-07-10 || Win ||align=left| Daniel Stefanovski || K1 Andy Hug Memorial 2017, Semi Final  || Zug, Switzerland || Decision (Unanimous)  || 3 || 3:00
|-
|-  style="background:#fbb;"
| 2016-04-03 || Loss ||align=left| Murthel Groenhart || WFL - Where Heroes Meet Legends, Final|| Almere, The Netherlands || KO (right cross) || 3 || 
|-
! style=background:white colspan=9 |
|-  style="background:#cfc;"
| 2016-04-03 || Win ||align=left| Darryl Sichtman || WFL - Where Heroes Meet Legends, Semi Final|| Almere, The Netherlands || Decision (unanimous) || 3 || 3:00
|-  style="background:#cfc;"
| 2016-2-13 || Win ||align=left| Ayoub Allach ||Rising Sun || Beilen, Netherlands || Decision || 5 || 3:00
|-  style="background:#cfc;"
| 2015-10-18 || Win ||align=left| Errol Koning || WFL "Unfinished Business"  || Hoofddorp, Netherlands || Decision || 3 || 3:00
|-  style="background:#fbb;"
| 2015-04-12 || Loss ||align=left| Hicham El Gaoui || World Fighting League, Semi Finals (-84 kg) || Hoofddorp, Netherlands || Decision  || 3 || 3:00
|-  style="background:#cfc;"
| 2014-12-06 || Win ||align=left| Hamza Rouki ||  Fight Fans : Prepare for glory || Amsterdam, Netherlands || Decision  || 3 || 3:00
|-  style="background:#cfc;"
| 2014-11-01 || Win ||align=left| Miles Simson ||  Bari Gym Kickboxgala 10  || Noordwijkerhout, Netherlands || Decision  || 3 || 3:00
|-  style="background:#cfc;"
| 2014-09-13 || Win ||align=left| Tom Duivenvoorde ||  House of Pain  || Alkmaar, Netherlands || KO (Left high Kick) || 1 || 
|-  style="background:#cfc;"
| 2014-02-08 || Win ||align=left| Marino Schouten || Fight Fans 8 || Amsterdam, Netherlands || Decision || 3 || 3:00
|-  style="background:#fbb;"
| 2013-12-01 || Loss ||align=left| Ibrahim El Bouni || Fight Fans 7 || Amsterdam, Netherlands || Decision || 3 || 3:00
|-  style="background:#cfc;"
| 2013-10-05 || Win ||align=left| Errol Koning || Fight Fans 6 || Amsterdam, Netherlands || Decision || 3 || 3:00
|-  style="background:#fbb;"
| 2013-08-17 || Loss ||align=left| Rickard Nordstrand || Fight Night 08 || Stockholm, Sweden || KO (punches) || 2 || 1:34
|-  style="background:#fbb;"
| 2012-09-29 || Loss ||align=left| Constantin Țuțu || KOK World GP 2012 in Chisinau || Chişinău, Moldova || Decision || 3 || 3:00
|-  style="background:#cfc;"
| 2011-10-09 || Win ||align=left| Miran Fabjan || The Wolfpack – Never Send a Sheep To Kill a Wolf  || Oostzaan, Netherlands || Decision || 3 || 3:00
|-  style="background:#cfc;"
| 2011-06-18 || Win ||align=left| Marino Schouten || Thaiboksgala BlokhuispoortKickboxing || Leeuwarden, Netherlands || Decision || 5 || 3:00 
|-  style="background:#cfc;"
| 2011-04-30 || Win ||align=left| Mohamed Belkacem || Ring Rules Kickboxing || Milan, Italy || Decision || 5 || 3:00
|-
! style=background:white colspan=9 |
|-  style="background:#cfc;"
| 2011-01-29 || Win ||align=left| Henry Akendiz || Mejiro Gym KickBox Gala  || Zaandam, Netherlands || Decision || 5 || 3:00 
|-  style="background:#fbb;"
| 2010-12-11 || Loss ||align=left| Oleksandr Oliynyk || KOK World GP 2010 in Chisinau, Quarter Finals || Chişinău, Moldova || TKO || ||  
|-  style="background:#cfc;"
| 2010-09-25 || Win ||align=left| Yassir Kadiri || Mejiro Gym Kickbox Gala|| Zaandam, Netherlands || Decision || 3 || 3:00
|-  style="background:#cfc;"
| 2010-01-09 || Win ||align=left| Amir Zeyada || Ring Sensation Championship: Uprising 12 || Rotterdam, Netherlands || Decision || 3 || 3:00 
|-  style="background:#fbb;"
| 2010-05-29 || Loss ||align=left| L'houcine Ouzgni || It's Showtime 2010 Amsterdam || Amsterdam, Netherlands || Decision (4-1) || 3 || 3:00  
|-  style="background:#fbb;"
| 2009-11-21 || Loss ||align=left| Dmitry Shakuta || It's Showtime 2009 Barneveld || Barneveld, Netherlands || Decision || 5 || 3:00  
|-
! style=background:white colspan=9 |
|-  style="background:#cfc;"
| 2009-05-16 || Win ||align=left| Imro Main || It's Showtime 2009 Amsterdam || Amsterdam, Netherlands || Decision (Unanimous) || 3 || 3:00 
|-  style="background:#cfc;"
| 2008-11-29 || Win ||align=left| Murthel Groenhart || It's Showtime 2008 Eindhoven || Eindhoven, Netherlands || Decision (Unanimous) || 3 || 3:00 
|-  style="background:#cfc;"
| 2008-10-26 || Win ||align=left| L'houcine Ouzgni || Top Team Gala Beverwijk || Beverwijk, Netherlands || KO (High Kick + Punch) || 5 || 
|-  style="background:#fbb;"
| 2008-09-06 || Loss ||align=left| Dmitry Shakuta || It's Showtime 2008 Alkmaar || Alkmaar, Netherlands || Decision || 5 || 3:00  
|-
! style=background:white colspan=9 |
|-  style="background:#cfc;"
| 2008-04-26 || Win ||align=left| Cosmo Alexandre || K-1 World GP 2008 Amsterdam, It's Showtime Reality Show '08 Final || Amsterdam, Netherlands || Decision (Majority) || 3 || 3:00 
|-
! style=background:white colspan=9 |
|-  style="background:#fbb;"
| 2008-03-15 || Loss ||align=left| Dmitry Shakuta || It's Showtime 75MAX Trophy Final 2008, Semi Finals || 's-Hertogenbosch, Netherlands || Decision || 3 || 3:00  
|-  style="background:#cfc;"
| 2008-03-15 || Win ||align=left| Jiri Zak || It's Showtime 75MAX Trophy Final 2008, Quarter Finals || 's-Hertogenbosch, Netherlands || Decision || 3 || 3:00  
|-  style="background:#cfc;"
| 2007-09- 23|| Win ||align=left| Amir Zeyada || It's Showtime Reality Show '08, Semi Final || Ko Samui || Decision || 3 || 3:00 
|-  style="background:#cfc;"
| 2007-09-23 || Win ||align=left| Yassin Boudrouz || It's Showtime Reality || Ko Samui || Decision|| 3 || 3:00  
|-  style="background:#cfc;"
| 2007-09-17|| Win ||align=left| Marco Santi || It's Showtime Reality || Petch Buncha Stadium, Thailand || Decision|| 3 || 3:00  
|-  style="background:#cfc;"
| 2007-06-30 || Win ||align=left| Tierry Mendes || W.A.K.O. Champions League || Porto, Portugal || Decision || 5 || 3:00 
|-
! style=background:white colspan=9 |
|-  style="background:#cfc;"
| 2007-04-? || Win ||align=left| Tierry Mendes || || Portugal || TKO || 3 ||  
|-  style="background:#fbb;"
| 2007-02-02 || Loss ||align=left| Tarik Slimani || It's Showtime 75MAX Trophy Zwolle, Quarter Finals || Zwolle, Netherlands || TKO (Ref Stop/Punches) || 1 ||  
|-  style="background:#cfc;"
| 2006-12-15 || Win ||align=left| Moises Ruibal || Lapelea Kickboxing || Tenerife, Spain || KO || 2 || 3:00  
|-  style="background:#cfc;"
| 2006-12-02 || Win ||align=left| Henry Akdeniz || It's Showtime 2006 Alkmaar || Alkmaar, Netherlands || Decision || 5 || 3:00  
|-  style="background:#cfc;"
| 2006-11-19 || Win ||align=left| Eric Kouman || K-1 MAX Canarias 2006, Final || Santa Cruz de Tenerife, Spain || KO (High Kick) || 1 ||  
|-
! style=background:white colspan=9 |
|-  style="background:#cfc;"
| 2006-11-19 || Win ||align=left| Loren || K-1 MAX Canarias 2006, Semi Finals || Santa Cruz de Tenerife, Spain || TKO (Low Kicks) || || 
|-  style="background:#cfc;"
| 2006-11-19 || Win ||align=left| Tarik Slimani || K-1 MAX Canarias 2006, Quarter Finals || Santa Cruz de Tenerife, Spain || Ext.R TKO || 4 ||  
|-  style="background:#cfc;"
| 2006-09-23 || Win ||align=left| Vincent Vielvoye || It's Showtime 75MAX Trophy Final 2006, Super Fight || Rotterdam, Netherlands || Decision || 3 || 3:00  
|-  style="background:#fbb;"
| 2006-06-18 || Loss ||align=left| Tyrone Spong || 2H2H The Road To Tokyo || Amsterdam, Netherlands || KO (Left hook) || 3 ||
|-  style="background:#cfc;"
| 2006-02-12 || Win ||align=left| Alfredo la Monte || Mauy Thai Gala in Amsterdam|| Amsterdam, Netherlands || KO ||  || 
|-  style="background:#fbb;"
| 2005-12-18 || Loss ||align=left| Ondřej Hutník || It's Showtime 75MAX Trophy Prague, Final || Prague, Czech Republic || Decision || 3 || 3:00  
|-
! style=background:white colspan=9 |
|-  style="background:#cfc;"
| 2005-12-18 || Win ||align=left| Arslan Magomedov || It's Showtime 75MAX Trophy Prague, Semi Finals || Prague, Czech Republic || Decision || 3 || 3:00  
|-  style="background:#fbb;"
| 2005-10-02 || Loss ||align=left| Emil Zoraj || It's Showtime 75MAX Trophy Tilburg, Final || Tilburg, Netherlands || Decision || 3 || 3:00  
|-
! style=background:white colspan=9 |
|-  style="background:#cfc;"
| 2005-10-02 || Win ||align=left| Jiri Zak || It's Showtime 75MAX Trophy Tilburg, Semi Finals || Tilburg, Netherlands || Decision || 3 || 3:00  
|-  style="background:#cfc;"
| 2005-09-21 || Win ||align=left| Tarvo || Thaiboks-en Freefight Gala Gym Alkmaar || Schermerhorn, Netherlands || KO || Round 2 || 3:00  
|-  style="background:#fbb;"
| 2005-06-12 || Loss ||align=left| Ondřej Hutník || It's Showtime 2005 Amsterdam || Amsterdam, Netherlands || Decision || 5 || 3:00
|-  style="background:#cfc;"
| 2005-04-23 || Win ||align=left| Cedric Copra || Staredown, ICL Sportcentrum Landsmeer || Landsmeer, Netherlands || Decision || 5 || 3:00  
|-  style="background:#fbb;"
| 2005-02-13 || Loss ||align=left| Joerie Mes || Muaythai in de Hoornse Vaart || Alkmaar, Netherlands || Decision (Unanimous) || 5 || 3:00
|-  style="background:#fbb;"
| 2004-12-19 || Loss ||align=left| Jiri Zak || Gala Landsmeer || Landsmeer, Netherlands || Decision || 5 || 3:00 
|-  style="background:#cfc;"
| 2004-05-15|| Win ||align=left| W. Koning || Mejiro Gym Kickbox gala Zilvermeeuwen || Zaandam, Netherlands || Decision (Unanimous) || 5 || 3:00  
|-  style="background:#cfc;"
| 2003-11-12 || Win ||align=left| Karapet Papijan || Veni, Vidi, Vici II || Veenendaal, Netherlands || Decision (Unanimous) || 5 || 2:00  
|-
| colspan=9 | Legend'':

See also 
List of It's Showtime champions
List of male kickboxers

References

External links
 fighter's profile - Sem Braan|K-1.de

1979 births
Living people
Dutch male kickboxers
Middleweight kickboxers
Dutch Muay Thai practitioners
Sportspeople from Amsterdam